Istvan Rozanich (1912–1984) was a Hungarian poet and, while living in exile in Venezuela during the second half of his life, newspaper editor. He published three volumes of poetry during his lifetime, and a collection in English, 'Selected Poems' was published in Hungary in 2005.

References

His book Kényer és Bor (Bread and Wine) was published in Argentina by Editorial Transsylvania  in 1974.  

Hungarian male poets
1984 deaths
1912 births
20th-century Hungarian poets
20th-century Hungarian male writers
Hungarian emigrants to Venezuela